Alone is a novella from 1903 by Swedish writer August Strindberg. The protagonist is a 50-year-old writer who has returned to Stockholm after spending several years in the countryside. The novel has been subject to treatment by a number of literary researchers. An English translation of the novella by Arvid Paulson was published under the title Days of Loneliness (New York: Phaedra, 1971).

Further reading

References

Novels by August Strindberg
1903 Swedish novels
Swedish novellas
Novels set in Stockholm
Swedish-language novels